The women's 3000 metres event at the 1994 World Junior Championships in Athletics was held in Lisbon, Portugal, at Estádio Universitário de Lisboa on 20 and 22 July.

Medalists

Results

Final
22 July

Heats
20 July

Heat 1

Heat 2

Participation
According to an unofficial count, 25 athletes from 20 countries participated in the event.

References

3000 metres
Long distance running at the World Athletics U20 Championships